The Exultant Ark is a 2011 non-fiction book by Jonathan Peter Balcombe.

It contends that animals engage in certain activities purely for pleasure.

References

External links
Google Books
Animals at Play nytimes.com

2011 non-fiction books
Cognitive science literature
University of California Press books